Mah-e Firuzan (also Romanized as Māh-e Fīrūzān; also known as Fīrūzān and Māh Parvīzān) is a village in Kaftarak Rural District, in the Central District of Shiraz County, Fars Province, Iran. At the 2006 census, its population was 498, in 134 families.

References 

Populated places in Shiraz County